Crime Klasik is a Philippine television documentary program that aired on AksyonTV (now One Sports) and TV5 from December 2, 2011 until January 30, 2013. On October 3, 2012, the program has moved to new day and timeslot, every Wednesday at 8:30 to 9:00 p.m. It is part of "AksyonTV Original" and is hosted by Martin Andanar.

Overview
The program features celebrated crime cases in the Philippines.

Host
Martin Andanar

Awards

Volunteer Against Crime and Corruption
2015 - Best Host for Martin Andanar

See also
 Case Unclosed

References

AksyonTV original programming
Philippine documentary television series
2011 Philippine television series debuts
2013 Philippine television series endings
Philippine reality television series
Filipino-language television shows
Documentary television series about crime